Christopher Edgar Barber (born January 15, 1964) is a former American and Canadian football defensive back in the National Football League (NFL), Canadian Football League (CFL), World League of American Football (WLAF) and Arena Football League (AFL). He played college football at North Carolina A&T.

References

1964 births
Living people
Players of American football from North Carolina
American football defensive backs
Canadian football defensive backs
American players of Canadian football
North Carolina A&T Aggies football players
Cincinnati Bengals players
Toronto Argonauts players
Raleigh–Durham Skyhawks players
Tampa Bay Buccaneers players
Cincinnati Rockers players
Fort Worth Cavalry players
San Jose SaberCats players
Orlando Predators players
Milwaukee Mustangs (1994–2001) players
New Jersey Red Dogs players
People from Fort Bragg, North Carolina
National Football League replacement players